Kinnikinnick is an unincorporated community in Ross County, Ohio, United States.

History
A post office called Kinnikinnick was established in 1878, and remained in operation until 1910. The community takes its name from Kinnikinnick Creek, which the community is located on.

Gallery

References

Unincorporated communities in Ross County, Ohio
Unincorporated communities in Ohio
1878 establishments in Ohio
Populated places established in 1878